Antonio Carlos Dos Santos (born 3 October 1979), known as just António Carlos, is a Brazilian former footballer who played as a midfielder. He was feared for his dangerous free kicks.

External links
 Brazilian FA Database 
 Career Statistics at sfl.ch

1979 births
Sportspeople from Paraná (state)
Living people
Brazilian footballers
Association football midfielders
FC Winterthur players
FC Frauenfeld players
FC Schaffhausen players
FC Baden players
FC Thun players
Grasshopper Club Zürich players
FC Sion players
PFC Chernomorets Burgas players
Grêmio Osasco Audax Esporte Clube players
Swiss Super League players
Swiss Challenge League players
Swiss Promotion League players
Swiss 1. Liga (football) players
2. Liga Interregional players
First Professional Football League (Bulgaria) players
Brazilian expatriate footballers
Expatriate footballers in Switzerland
Brazilian expatriate sportspeople in Switzerland
Expatriate footballers in Bulgaria
Brazilian expatriate sportspeople in Bulgaria